State Road 817, Route 817, or Highway 817, may refer to routes in the following countries:

Canada
Alberta Highway 817

Costa Rica
 National Route 817

United States